Terenten is a comune (municipality) in South Tyrol in northern Italy, located about  northeast of Bolzano.

Geography

The municipality of Terenten contains the frazione (subdivision) Pichlern (Colli in Pusteria).

Terenten borders the following municipalities: Kiens, Mühlwald, and Vintl.

History

Coat-of-arms
The emblem represents a sable plough on gules background; it is the symbol of the local agriculture. The arms were granted in 1969.

Society

Linguistic distribution
According to the 2011 census, 99.40% of the population speak German, 0.54% Italian and 0.06% Ladin as first language.

Demographic evolution

References

External links
 Homepage of the municipality
 Tourist Information Terenten

Municipalities of South Tyrol